Leslie Guy Wilky (1888–1971) was an American cinematographer who worked in Hollywood in the 1910s and the 1920s. He often collaborated with director William C. deMille. Wilky was born in Phoenix, Arizona, to William Wilky and Emma Mosier. He later attended the University of Arizona, where he studied engineering, before moving to Santa Barbara, California, and finding work as a cinematographer at Flying A Studios. Eventually he ended up in Los Angeles, where he had a substantial career at Paramount. He was also a founding member of the American Society of Cinematographers.

Selected filmography 
 1928 The Power of Silence
 1927 One Woman to Another
 1925 The Splendid Crime
 1925 New Brooms
 1925 The Trouble with Wives
 1925 Lost: A Wife
 1925 Men and Women
 1925 New Lives for Old (as Guy Wilky) 
 1925 Locked Doors
 1924 The Fast Set
 1924 The Man Who Fights Alone
 1924 The Bedroom Window
 1923 Don't Call It Love
 1923 The Marriage Maker
 1923 Adam's Rib
 1923 Only 38 (as Guy Wilky) 
 1923 The World's Applause
 1922 Nice People (as Guy Wilky) 
 1922 Our Leading Citizen
 1922 Bought and Paid For
 1921 Miss Lulu Bett
 1921 After the Show
 1921 The Lost Romance (as Guy Wilky) 
 1921 What Every Woman Knows
 1920 Midsummer Madness (as Guy Wilky) 
 1920 Conrad in Quest of His Youth
 1920 The Prince Chap
 1920 Jack Straw
 1920 The Tree of Knowledge (as Guy Wilky) 
 1919 The Woman Michael Married
 1919 Tangled Threads
 1919 Josselyn's Wife
 1919 All of a Sudden Norma
 1918 Two-Gun Betty
 1918 The Goddess of Lost Lake
 1917 A Man's Man

References

External links

American cinematographers
People from Phoenix, Arizona
1888 births
1971 deaths
University of Arizona alumni